SS France may refer to:
 , a French liner sunk in 1915
 , a French liner scrapped in 1936
 , a French liner; later renamed SS Norway; scrapped in 2008.

See also
 France II
 
 
 

Ship names